The Architectural Association of Ireland is an organisation dedicated to architecture in Ireland. It is not a professional accredited organisation but is open to all. Its activities include the organisation of a public lecture series, an annual architectural awards scheme, site visits, and exhibitions. It also produces publications, including the Building Material journal.

Foundation
The AAI was founded in 1896 "to promote and afford facilities for the study of architecture and the allied sciences and arts, and to provide a medium of friendly communication between members and others interested in the progress of architecture".

Membership
Membership in the AAI is open to architects, architecture students, and anyone interested in the progress of architectural culture.

See also
Royal Institute of the Architects of Ireland

References

External links
 

Architecture in Ireland